Juan Carlos Rulfo Aparicio (born January 24, 1964, in Mexico City) is a Mexican screenwriter and director and the son of author Juan Rulfo. He has written, produced, and photographed several films.

Biography 
Juan Nepomuceno Carlos Pérez Rulfo Aparicio, the son of the Mexican writer Juan Rulfo and Clara Aparicio de Rulfo, studied film at the Autonomous Metropolitan University in Xochimilco and at the Cinematographic Training Center in Mexico City.  Due to the heritage his father left him, Juan Carlos has naturally known how to translate cinematographic narrative from rural Mexico to his father's workings of literature.

His first film was his thesis for his graduation from film school, Grandfather Cheno and Other Stories, a documentary that tells the story of his grandfather and fits it in with his father's story Tell Them Not to Kill Me.

Rulfo's movie In The Pit won the Grand Jury Prize for an International Documentary at the Sundance Film Festival. He also won the Ariel Awards for Best Editing and Best First Work for his movie Del Olvido al No me Acuerdo, and was nominated for Best Direction and Best Screenplay Written Directly for the Screen.  Rulfo has also won awards at the Goya Awards, the Guadalajara International Film Festival, the Havana Film Festival, the Karlovy Vary International Film Festival, the Montréal World Film Festival.

His 2007 film In The Pit follows the construction crew at work in the construction of the second deck of the Periférico beltway in Mexico City. His 2012 film Carrière, 250 Metres is a biopic of the French screenwriter Jean-Claude Carrière. In 2017, he directed 3 episodes of the TV mini series Cien años con Juan Rulfo which were dedicated to highlight the work of his father. For his 2021 documentary film Letters from a Distance (Cartas a Distancia), Philip Glass composed the music for the film.

Personal life 
Juan Carlos Rulfo is married to Valentina Leduc Navarro, a Mexican director.

Filmography

References

External links

Juan Carlos Rulfo in the Video Data Bank

1964 births
Living people
Film directors from Mexico City